It was a Dacian fortified town.

Dacian fortresses in Prahova County
History of Muntenia